Berriedale is a small estate village on the northern east coast of Caithness, Scotland, on the A9 road between Helmsdale and Lybster, close to the boundary between Caithness and Sutherland. It is sheltered from the North Sea. The village has a parish church in the Church of Scotland.

 Just south of Berriedale, on the way to the north, the A9 road passes the Berriedale Braes, a steep drop in the landscape (brae is a Scots word for hillside, a borrowing of the Scottish Gaelic bràighe). The road drops down steeply (13% over 1,3 km) to bridge a river, before rising again (13% over 1,3 km), with a number of sharp bends in the road – although some of the hairpin bends and other nearby gradients have been eased in recent years.

The impracticality (and cost) of bridging the Berriedale Braes prevented the building of the Inverness-Wick Far North Line along the east coast of Caithness; instead the railway runs inland through the Flow Country.

Berriedale is located at the end of the eighth stage of the coastal John o' Groats Trail.

Berriedale is listed as the place of death on the death certificate of Prince George, Duke of Kent, younger brother of King George VI. He was killed in an air crash nearby on 25 August 1942, alongside 14 others.

References

 

Populated places in Caithness
Roads in Scotland